The 2000 Ms. Olympia contest is an IFBB professional bodybuilding competition and part of Joe Weider's Olympia Fitness & Performance Weekend 2000 was held on October 21, 2000, at the Mandalay Bay Arena in Paradise, Nevada. It was the 21st Ms. Olympia competition held. Other events at the exhibition include the Mr. Olympia and Fitness Olympia contests.

Weight-in
Heavyweights over 135 pounds:

 Lesa Lewis - 
 Yaxeni Oriquen - 
 Vickie Gates - 
 Valentina Chepiga - 

Lightweights up to 135 pounds:

 Andrulla Blanchette - 
 Renee Casella - 
 Brenda Raganot -

Pre-judging

Round 1

Lightweight call outs

 1st - Andrulla Blanchette, Brenda Raganot, and Renee Casella
 2nd - Jennifer McVicar and Cathy LeFrançois Priest

Heavyweight call outs
 1st - Lesa Lewis, Vickie Gates, and Valentina Chepiga
 2nd - Iris Kyle, Th-resa Bostick, Denise Hoshor, and Yaxeni Oriquen

Round 2

Lightweight call outs
 1st - Renee Casella, Andrulla Blanchette, and Brenda Raganot
 2nd - Cathy LeFrançois Priest and Jennifer McVicar

Heavyweight call outs
 1st - Lesa Lewis, Vickie Gates, and Valentina Chepiga
 2nd - Iris Kyle, Denise Hoshor, Th-resa Bostick, and Yaxeni Oriquen

Results

Scorecard

Attended
5th Ms. Olympia attended - Vickie Gates
4th Ms. Olympia attended - Lesa Lewis and Andrulla Blanchette
3rd Ms. Olympia attended - Valentina Chepiga and Yaxeni Oriquen-Garcia
2nd Ms. Olympia attended - Renee Casella, Iris Kyle, and Brenda Raganot
1st Ms. Olympia attended - Th-resa Bostick, Denise Hoshor, Cathy LeFrançois, and Jennifer McVicar
Previous year Olympia attendees who did not attend - Laura Binetti, Kim Chizevsky, Tazzie Colomb, Laura Creavalle, and Gayle Moher

Notable Events
This competition had only 12 competitors competing, the fewest competitors competing in Ms. Olympia ever. Only the 1996 Ms. Olympia would match this to have 12 competitors competing.
Mike Alley and Corinna Everson were the commentators for ESPN2 coverage of the 2000 Ms. Olympia.
Jennifer McVicar received a special invite to attend the 2000 Ms. Olympia.
Valentina Chepiga was upset when she was weighed in and weighed over 135 lbs, making her compete in the heavyweight division.
Bev Francis was one of the judges of the 2000 Ms. Olympia.

2000 Ms. Olympia changes 
The IFBB introduced several changes to Ms. Olympia in 2000. The first change was that Ms. Olympia contest would no longer be held as a separate contest, instead became part of the "Olympia Weekend" in Las Vegas and held the day before the men's show. The second change was when heavyweight and lightweight classes where added. The third change was the new judging guidelines for presentations were introduced. A letter to the competitors from Jim Manion (chairman of the Professional Judges Committee) stated that women would be judged on healthy appearance, face, makeup, and skin tone. The criteria given in Manion's letter included the statement "symmetry, presentation, separations, and muscularity BUT NOT TO THE EXTREME!" The 2000 Ms. Olympia is the only Ms. Olympia with no overall winner, with Andrulla Blanchette winning lightweight class and Valentina Chepiga winning heavyweight class.

See also
 2000 Mr. Olympia

References

 2000 Ms Olympia Results
 2000 Ms. Olympia

External links
 Competitor History of the Ms. Olympia

Ms Olympia, 2000
2000 in bodybuilding
Ms. Olympia
Ms. Olympia
History of female bodybuilding